The 1996 Tennessee United States Senate election was held on November 5, 1996,  to elect the U.S. Senator from the state of Tennessee.  Republican Senator Fred Thompson ran for re-election to a full six-year term.  Thompson defeated the Democratic challenger, Covington lawyer Houston Gordon in the general election.

Candidates

Democratic Party
 Houston Gordon, attorney

Republican Party
 Fred Thompson, incumbent U.S. Senator

Election results

See also 
 1996 United States Senate elections

References 

1996 Tennessee elections
Tennessee
1996